The Rugby Canada Super League (RCSL or Super League) was a national, semi-professional rugby union competition in Canada. The league represented the second level of domestic rugby union in Canada, and the highest level wholly indigenous to Canada. In terms of seniority it rested immediately beneath the IRB sponsored North America 4, a former US/Canadian cross-border competition in which two Canadian teams (Canada East and Canada West) took part. Most players took part in RCSL ("Super League") on an amateur basis.

In early 2009, after 11 seasons of play, Rugby Canada decided to disband the RCSL in the wake of the establishment of the Americas Rugby Championship, the successor to the North America 4. The RCSL was replaced by the Canadian Rugby Championship and the Rugby Canada National Junior Championship, which absorbed the majority of the RCSL teams.

Overview
The competition was established in 1998 and had been played on an annual basis. It is considered to be Canada's premier wholly domestic rugby competition. Players on Canada's senior men's team were often chosen from Super League clubs.

The Super League drew its teams from provincial unions. Larger unions (BC, Alberta, and Ontario) had more than one representative team; those teams were drawn largely from provincial sub-unions. For example, the Calgary Rugby Union and Edmonton Rugby Union are sub-unions of the larger Alberta Rugby Union and had both been given representation in the Super League.

Teams were divided into Eastern and Western Divisions and played each of the other teams in their division once. The top team in each division played each other for the national championship.

The league rarely had identical membership from season to season, with teams who have membership occasionally electing not to play due to financial, logistical or level-of-play concerns.  For 2006 season, the Fraser Valley Rugby Union of B.C. ("The Venom") and the Manitoba Rugby Union ("The Buffalo") elected not to participate, which created an unbalanced situation where the Western Division had five teams (therefore only four games in their season), while the Eastern Division had seven (six games).

Teams

Western Conference

Eastern Conference

Champions

See also
 Canada national rugby union team
 Rugby union in Canada
 Canadian Rugby Championship

External links 
 Rugby Canada

 
Defunct rugby union leagues in Canada
Sports leagues established in 1998
1998 establishments in Canada